is a 1980 Japanese kaiju film directed by Noriaki Yuasa and produced by Daiei Film. It is the eighth film in the Gamera film series, following the release of Gamera vs. Zigra in 1971.

Gamera: Super Monster was distributed by New Daiei, and was released theatrically in Japan on 20 March 1980. It was followed by Gamera: Guardian of the Universe in 1995, which would mark the beginning of the franchise's Heisei period.

Plot
When the evil alien Zanon comes to enslave Earth, all hope seems lost. The Earth's resident superheroes, the Spacewomen, are powerless to stop him. They must enlist the help of a young boy who has a special connection with the giant turtle Gamera. The Friend of All Children then battles Gyaos (a huge vampire bat/pterosaur hybrid), Zigra (an alien shark), Viras (an alien squid), Jiger (a female giant prehistoric dinosaur), Guiron (a knife-headed alien monster) and finally Barugon (an enormous lizard whose tongue sprays a freeze-gas that can freeze things solid and whose back spines emit a powerful rainbow ray that can melt or dissolve any solid object). Gamera sacrifices his life in the end to destroy Zanon once and for all and to protect Earth one last time.

Cast

Production
Gamera: Super Monster contains extensive stock footage of the entire Gamera film series, as well as Space Battleship Yamato and Galaxy Express 999. Almost all of the footage of Gamera is stock footage. The movie was made as an attempt to help Daiei get out of its turbulent financial situation.

Release
Gamera: Super Monster was released theatrically in Japan on March 20, 1980, where it was distributed by New Daiei.

Home media

Elvira's Movie Macabre 
The movie was featured on a 1983 episode of Elvira's Movie Macabre, which Shout! Factory released on a DVD in 2007 together with the 1967 British film They Came from Beyond Space. The two films can each be watched with or without the Elvira host segments.

Cinema Insomnia 
In 2007, Gamera: Super Monster was shown on the horror hosted television series Cinema Insomnia. Apprehensive Films later released the Cinema Insomnia episode onto DVD in both regular and special "Slime Line" editions.

Shout! Factory release 
Shout! Factory acquired the rights from Kadokawa Pictures for all eight of the Showa era Gamera films and have issued the uncut Japanese versions on DVD for the first time in North America. These "Special Edition" DVDs were released in sequential order, starting with Gamera, the Giant Monster (1965) on May 18, 2010.

Notes

References

Sources

External links

 Gamera web archive (Japanese)
 
 

1980 films
1980 fantasy films
Gamera films
Kaiju films
Films directed by Noriaki Yuasa
Japanese sequel films
Space adventure films
Giant monster films
Films set in Tokyo
Films set in Osaka
Films set in Kobe
Films set in Nagoya
Films set in Chigasaki, Kanagawa
Films set in Kamogawa
Films set in Shiga Prefecture
Films set in Toyama Prefecture
Daiei Film films
Films produced by Masaichi Nagata
1980s monster movies
Films scored by Shunsuke Kikuchi
1980s Japanese films